100 Miles & Running is the third official mixtape by Washington, D.C. rapper Wale. It was released on July 11, 2007. The mixtape was mixed by Nick Catchdubs and featured remixes of songs by Amy Winehouse, Lily Allen and Justice. The mixtape also includes appearances from Daniel Merriweather, Mark Ronson and Tabi Bonney. XXL Magazine gave the mixtape a positive review and called Wale "the thinking man's Lil' Wayne", while the Chicago Reader picked it as a staff favorite from 2007 and called "W.A.L.E.D.A.N.C.E.", Wale's remix of Justice's "D.A.N.C.E", "positively epic". Wale and Ronson performed the song at the 2007 MTV Video Music Awards and Wale later appeared on the cover of URB with Justice.

Track listing

References

External links
Interview with Wale on WIRED
Review in the Chicago Reader
Review in Exclaim!
Interview with Wale on XXL Magazine
Interview on MTV News

2007 mixtape albums
Wale (rapper) compilation albums